The West Indies women's cricket team played the Pakistan women's cricket team in November 2021. The tour consisted of three Women's One Day Internationals (WODIs), with both teams using the matches as practice ahead of the 2021 Women's Cricket World Cup Qualifier tournament in Zimbabwe. Following the tour, the West Indies men's team also toured Pakistan. On 3 November 2021, the West Indies team arrived in Pakistan, with more than 800 security staff assigned to safeguard the players.

Ahead of the series, six players in Pakistan's squad tested positive for COVID-19, but the Pakistan Cricket Board (PCB) confirmed they would have a squad ready for the opening match. As a result, captain Javeria Khan and Diana Baig were ruled out Pakistan's squad for the opening match. Sidra Nawaz was named as Pakistan's captain for the fixture.

The West Indies won the opening match by 45 runs, with Deandra Dottin scoring a century. The West Indies won the second match by 37 runs to win the series with a match to play. The West Indies then won the third and final match by six wickets to win the series 3–0.

Squads

Cherry-Ann Fraser, Shabika Gajnabi and Karishma Ramharack were all named as travelling reserves for the West Indies.

WODI series

1st WODI

2nd WODI

3rd WODI

Notes

References

External links
Series home at ESPN Cricinfo

West Indies 2021-22
Pakistan 2021-22
International cricket competitions in 2021–22
2022 in Pakistani cricket
2022 in West Indian cricket
2022 in women's cricket